Chris Blight (born October 14, 1982) is a Canadian professional ice hockey right winger who currently plays for the Dundee Stars of Elite Ice Hockey League.

Playing career
Blight played four-years of hockey for Clarkson University of the NCAA starting in 2001. He was ranked 156th in the NHL draft by NHL central scouting for the 2002 draft. After college hockey he signed with the Toledo Storm of the ECHL as an undrafted free agent. A prolific scoring career in the ECHL allowed him to be signed by many AHL teams during his four-year career in North America.  He was signed by the Reading Royals on 4 October 2010.

On 25 July 2011, Blight signed with Ritten Renon of Italy's Serie A.  On 8 June 2012, Blight moved to the United Kingdom to sign with the Cardiff Devils of the EIHL. where he is currently playing in the 2013–14 season. Blight now plays for the EIHL  Gardiner Conference Champions Dundee Stars.

Career statistics

References

External links
 
 
 

1982 births
Albany River Rats players
Bridgeport Sound Tigers players
Canadian ice hockey right wingers
Cardiff Devils players
Dundee Stars players
Clarkson Golden Knights men's ice hockey players
Hershey Bears players
Ice hockey people from Ontario
Living people
Manitoba Moose players
Nordsjælland Cobras players
People from Cambridge, Ontario
Portland Pirates players
Reading Royals players
Ritten Sport players
Sheffield Steelers players
Toledo Storm players
Wilkes-Barre/Scranton Penguins players
Worcester Sharks players
Canadian expatriate ice hockey players in Scotland
Canadian expatriate ice hockey players in England
Canadian expatriate ice hockey players in Wales
Canadian expatriate ice hockey players in Denmark
Canadian expatriate ice hockey players in Italy
Canadian expatriate ice hockey players in Germany
Canadian expatriate ice hockey players in the United States